Robert Reed (or Reade; died 1415) was a Bishop of Waterford and Lismore, Bishop of Carlisle and Bishop of Chichester.

Reed was a Dominican friar. He was selected as Bishop of Waterford on 9 September 1394, and transferred to Carlisle on 26 January 1396.

Reed was translated from Carlisle to Chichester on 5 October 1396. 

Reed died in June 1415. Reed requested, in his will, that he wished to be buried at the foot of his predecessor William Rede before the high altar of Chichester cathedral.

Citations

References

 
 

Bishops of Carlisle
1415 deaths
Bishops of Chichester
14th-century English Roman Catholic bishops
15th-century English Roman Catholic bishops
Year of birth unknown
Bishops of Waterford and Lismore